Zlatko Buzina (born 6 March 1966) is a Croatian rower. He competed in the men's coxless pair event at the 1992 Summer Olympics.

References

External links
 

1966 births
Living people
Croatian male rowers
Olympic rowers of Croatia
Rowers at the 1992 Summer Olympics
Sportspeople from Zagreb